Warundeep Singh is an Indian football player who plays as defender.

Career

Early career
Warundeep was born in Jalandhar and he started playing football in the year 1999. He was playing football locally in his area. He joined TFA in 2002 and passed out in 2006.

Churchill Brothers
He joined Churchill Brothers in 2006 and played there for 5 years. He was part of the team which won the Durand Cup in 2007, where they defeated Mahindra United in the final by 1-0. He also played in the 2009 IFA Shield final where they defeated Mohun Bagan to clinch the title. He was also part of the team which won the 2008-09 I-League. He was part of the team in 1st leg though in return leg he got injured.

Sporting Clube de Goa
In July 2011 Singh signed for recently promoted team Sporting Clube de Goa who also plays in the I-League.

Mohun Bagan
He signed for Kolkata giant Mohun Bagan on 20 June 2012.

International
While Warundeep was in TFA, he got chance in the U-19 Indian team, Which played a tournament held in Jamshedpur. In the next year, he was part of the U-19 Indian team that played in a tournament in Thailand.

Then for the U-23 Indian team, where India played in the 2006 South Asian Games where India finished runners up, losing to Pakistan in the final. He also played in the Olympic Qualifiers.

He have been called for India national football team camp a few times.

Honours

India U20
 South Asian Games Silver medal: 2004

References

External links
 

1986 births
Living people
Footballers from Jalandhar
Indian footballers
Churchill Brothers FC Goa players
I-League players
Sporting Clube de Goa players
Mohun Bagan AC players
Mohammedan SC (Kolkata) players
Association football defenders
South Asian Games silver medalists for India
South Asian Games medalists in football